Bluie was the United States military code name for Greenland during World War II. It is remembered by the numbered sequence of base locations identified by the 1941 United States Coast Guard South Greenland Survey Expedition, and subsequently used in radio communications by airmen unfamiliar with pronunciation of the Inuit and Old Norse names of those locations. These were typically spoken BLUIE (direction) (number), with direction being east or west along the Greenland coast from Cape Farewell.

 Bluie East One: Torgilsbu radio and weather station at  near Aqissiat on Prince Christian Sound
 Bluie East Two: Ikateq airfield with radio and weather station at  
 Bluie East Four: Ella Island radio, weather, and sledge patrol station at 
 Bluie East Five: Eskimonæs radio and weather station captured by German troops in 1943 and later reestablished at Myggbukta 
 Bluie West One: Narsarsuaq Air Base at 
 Bluie West Two: Kipisako unused alternative airfield location on Coppermine Bay
 Bluie West Three: Simiutak HF/DF station at 
 Bluie West Four: Marrak Point  radio and weather station at 
 Bluie West Six: Thule radio and weather station at 
 Bluie West Eight: Sondrestrom Air Base at 
 Bluie West Nine: Cruncher Island light and radio beacon at

Notes

Sources
 

 
History of Greenland